Eduard Brückner (29 July 1862 – 20 May 1927) was a geographer, glaciologist and climatologist.

Biography
He was born in Jena, the son of the Baltic-German historian Alexander Brückner and Lucie Schiele. After an education at the Karlsruhe gymnasium, beginning in 1881 he studied meteorology and physics at the University of Dorpat, graduating in 1885. He joined the Deutsche Seewarte (German Hydrographic Office) in Hamburg, then, following studies at Dresden and Munich, he became a professor at the University of Bern in 1888. The same year he married Ernestine Steine. In 1899, he was rector at the university. He moved back to Germany in 1904, becoming a professor at the University of Halle. Two years later in 1906, he was a professor at the University of Vienna. He died in Vienna.

Professor Brückner was an expert on alpine glaciers and their effect upon the landscape. Between 1901–1909 he collaborated with German geographer and geologist Albrecht Penck to produce a three volume work titled Die Alpen im Eiszeitalter (The Alps in the Ice Age). This served as a standard reference on the ice ages for several decades thereafter. Brückner was a proponent of the importance of climate change, including the effects on the economy and social structure of society. His research included studies of past climate changes and he proposed the 35-year-long Brückner cycle of cold, damp weather alternating with warm, dry weather in northwest Europe.

The GKSS Research Centre's Eduard Brückner Prize, for outstanding achievement in interdisciplinary climate research, is named after him.

References

1862 births
1927 deaths
German geographers
German glaciologists
German climatologists
Quaternary geologists
University of Tartu alumni
Academic staff of the University of Bern
Academic staff of the University of Halle
Academic staff of the University of Vienna
German emigrants to Austria-Hungary